Simon Michael Abney-Hastings, 15th Earl of Loudoun (born 29 October 1974), styled as Lord Mauchline until 2012, is a British aristocrat living in Australia who is the current holder of the ancient Scottish noble title of Earl of Loudoun.

Biography 
The Earl of Loudoun is the son of Michael Abney-Hastings, 14th Earl of Loudoun, whom he succeeded in 2012. He resides in Wangaratta and Melbourne, Victoria.

 Hereditary Governor / Patron - Repton School Collage, Derbyshire
 Patron - Ashby de la Zouch Museum
 Patron - Friends of Loudoun Kirk
 President - The Board of Governors, St Andrew's First Aid Australia
 Patron - Melbourne Highland Games, Australia. (Formally Ringwood Highland Games)
 Patron - Australian Monarchist League, Victoria Branch
 Patron - Clan Campbell Society of Australia
 Patron - Barnet 1471 Battlefields Society
 Patron - Australia Day Council - Victoria. Australia
 Protector - Order of St Thomas of Acre, Order of St Thomas of Acre
 Kentucky Colonel 2022 - Highest Honor Commonwealth of Kentucky USA 
 Esteemed friend of Loudoun Museum, Leesburg, Loudoun County, Virginia USA
 Chieftain of the Day 2022 - Brigadoon Highland Games - Bundanoon NSW
 Chieftain of the Day 2023 - Brigadoon Highland Games - Bundanoon NSW
 Chieftain of the Day 2023 - Aberdeen Highland Games

The heir presumptive to the title is the present holder's brother, the Hon. Marcus William Abney-Hastings (b. 1981).

Ancestry 
Through his grandmother Barbara Huddleston Abney-Hastings, 13th Countess of Loudoun, he is directly descended from, and heir-general of George Plantagenet, 1st Duke of Clarence, brother of Edward IV and Richard III.

Royal descent 

In 2004, Britain's Real Monarch—a documentary broadcast on Channel 4 in the United Kingdom—repeated the claim that the Earl's father, as the senior descendant of George Plantagenet, 1st Duke of Clarence, was the rightful King of England. This argument involves the claim that Edward IV of England was illegitimate. The Earl, following his father's death, would have become the rightful monarch of England under this alternative path of succession, rather than Elizabeth II and would be the current monarch rather than Charles III.

References 

1974 births
Australian peers
Earls of Loudoun
People from Wangaratta
Living people
Australian monarchists